Seyqal Sara may refer to:
 Seyqal Sara, Astaneh-ye Ashrafiyeh
 Seyqal Sara, Rezvanshahr